Motor Maids is a women's motorcycle club in North America with over 1,300 members from the United States and Canada. Established in 1940, Motor Maids was one of the first women's motorcycle groups and has been called the oldest existing women's club in the United States. The first president of Motor Maids was Dot Robinson, who held the position for 25 years.

Purpose and activities
The objective of this group is to promote safe riding habits, meet new people and travel across North America. Every year they travel around North America going to different events as a group including every July they have a Motor Maid convention. Almost every week or weekend there are meetings or events with this group whether it is a charity event or just a ride along. Motor Maids is committed to safety with their members. Before they go on a ride as a group they have many safety checks they have to follow.

The mission statement of this group is to ride together as a group and club, to have fun as a group, respect history and believe in the traditions. Arthur Davidson, one of the founders of Harley-Davidson Motor Company, supported the Motor Maids which benefited the group.

History
When this group first started it was composed of 51 members in 1940 and has grown to over 1,300 members.

Linda Dugeau and Dot Robinson co-founded Motor Maids with 51 members and a dream. She took interest in the idea of creating a women’s group in the 1930s and took the liberty to reach out to motorcycle dealerships, AMA clubs and fellow riders in search to find women riders who would take part in helping her form a motorcycle organization of females. Although the idea of forming a group took ten years before becoming reality it took Dugeau and her old friend Dot Robinson three of the ten years to find willing female participants to be considered as Motor Maid members. Once the organization found its standing legs the organization expanded quickly, and opportunities to showcase themselves at parades and other events approached them quickly because they had a distinctive image. The Motor Maids organization became very popular throughout the United States of America and president Dot Robinson and secretary Linda Dugeau were ecstatic with the movement they were creating.

Initially, 'The Motor Maids of America', it was a social club for women riders of all makes whose members have included some of the most influence women in American motorcycling [8] and which hoped to prove women could ride motorcycles and still maintain their femininity, avoiding allegations of being 'mannish', 'man-haters' or lesbians,[9] although some early members were. [10] Indeed, its original colors were pink before, in 1944, changing to royal blue and silver gray at which the same time they adopted their shield logo. White gloves were also part of the uniform. [11] Its purpose was to unite women motorcyclists in promoting interests in motorcycling and required the membership to legally own and operate their own motorcycle or one belonging to a family member. The Motor Maids have members in almost every state of the USA, including Hawaii and Alaska, and several Canadian Provinces. [7]

Founders

Linda Dugeau

Linda Dugeau born May 15, 1913 in Cape Cod, Massachusetts is present day Motor Maids organization founder. Linda was a very smart and well-connected women knowing as she graduated from Wellesley College located in Wellesley, Massachusetts. In 1932 at the age of 19 Linda learned how to ride a JD Harley-Davidson motorcycle and her boyfriend Bud, who would later become her husband, was the one to teach her. Later on Dugeau had "sought to emulate the Ninety-Nines, an organization of elite women pilots founded in 1930 by Amelia Earhart, so, in 1940 she had officially established the women’s motorcycle organization that she titled "The Motor Maids". One summer Dugeau took a trip to Michigan to visit her mother, she visited the Harley-Davidson Factory and was a guest of Bill Davidson, she also went to the World’s Fair located in New York City covering a total of 3,500 miles only spending a total of $40 on the trip itself. Dugeau also toured the Canadian area to satisfy her need to ride and explore. Dugeau loved the riding her motorcycle so much that in 1950 she decided to reside in Los Angeles areas so she may enjoy riding year round instead of seasonally. Five decades later on February 17, 2000 at age 86 Linda Dugeau died.

Dot Robinson

Dot Robinson was born April 22, 1912 in Australia. James Goulding, Robinson's father, was a motorcyclist who worked as a sidecar designer and an amateur racer. When Robinson was about six years old her father moved him and his family to the United States in 1918 in hopes to expand his sidecar designing business. Robinson was almost destined to ride a motorcycle because Robinson's father was into the business and ran a motorcycle dealership, so at a young age Robinson became well acquainted with operating a bike. In high school Dot met her future husband Earl who she would eventually marry in 1931 and together they partook in multiple races. Dot entered herself in a Jack Pine National Endurance Championship in 1934, and by 1940 she won Jack Pine and became known as the first woman to win an AMA national competition. In 1935 Harley-Davidson asked Dot and her high school sweetheart, Earl, to run a dealership. Shortly after Davidson requested they help him by opening a dealership the Robinsons moved to Detroit where they operated a successful Harley-Davidson dealership until 1971. Linda Dugeau and Dot Robinson met in 1940 at the Laconia national and within months the Motor Maids organization was in full motion. Dot was president of the organization and Linda secretary of the organization. The motorcyclist image was always black with leather until Dot Robinson changed the attire allowing women to continue to have their femininity. Robinson was always seen as a very classy lady and she wanted all women who were included in her organization to have the same image. The change Dot made the attire of her organization made a statement of empowerment while still feminine. When the Robinsons retired from the dealership in 1971 they begin to travel together by motorcycle until Earl died I 1996. Even after Dot's husband died she continued to ride and explore until 1998 when a knee replacement slowed her down, and on October 8, 1999 Dot Robinson died at age 87.

Motor Maids organizations and charities
Motor maids are not only just a women's bike group that ride together, they are also a big part of the community. They participate in the community and help charities and other groups such as breast cancer awareness. They are part of many dinners, showings and conventions to promote their group and help others. On their website it lays out all of their up-and-coming events showing that they are a large part of the community. An example of their support in the community was a group putting together and hosting a bike night for a fellow friend with breast cancer. They helped raise money for someone in the community.
 The group also participates in the Six-County Firemen Association's Convention-Mount Carmel, PA in 2010 wearing their signature white gloves which is a part of their uniforms since 1941. The ladies of Motor Maids parade in the Charity Newsies event every year up until 1979 and in 2012 were asked once again to ride in the 150th anniversary of this parade. Even after 1979 when they stopped parading every year, they were asked by many other organizations to participate in races and parades around the country and Canada.

Along with riding in parades and hosting bike nights to help someone in the community, the groups around the country also host their annual conventions. Their convention is always in July and is held in different locations around the US and Canada. During convention they typically expect around 300-400 people and their guests to attend and make accommodations for all the guest and their families. The Pechanga Resort and Casino in Temecula, California was home base for the 2019 three-day event hosted by the Motor Maids district of California/Hawaii.  The next convention will be held in Rapid City, South Dakota starting on July 5, 2022. The last 2 years were cancelled due to the pandemic. The Motor Maids hold these conventions to share stories, renew friendships, and conduct club business. This year’s conventions will be the group's 80th anniversary. These conventions include a timed road run, self-guided tours of the area, and a parade of the Motor Maids through the community that is hosting the event that year.  Here is the parade from 2019 in Temecula https://motormaidsinc.smugmug.com/Conventions/2019-Temecula-California/2019-Temeculah-Parade/i-BMPKNKD/A.

Each District hosts local events and support various charities.

Logo, color, and uniform  
Back in the 1940s there were many members that were in the military. During that time period it was not easy for all of the members to get together for meetings because of gas rationing. On May 27 and 28, 1944 the first formal convention was held. This meeting was led by Jane Farrow and Jo Folden in Columbus, Ohio. The first Regional Meeting was held later that year in Plainfield, New Jersey. From this came the decision on the colors and the logo for Motor Maids. It was decided that royal blue and silver gray would make up the colors and a shield would represent the logo. Another thing that came from this meeting was the uniform for the group. At the start the uniforms were tailor-made of silver-gray gabardine with royal blue piping. This soon changed and the uniform became gray slacks, royal blue over-blouse with white boots, and a tie. Down the road in 2006, the group voted to change the uniform again. It was then changed to what it is in present day. It consists of black pants and boots, royal blue mock neck long sleeved shirt with a white cotton vest, and white gloves. White gloves were added in 1941 when Howard Foley went to the Motor Maids with the idea of parading at the Charity Newsies Race. During this parade, the Motor Maids wore white gloves making them known as the "Ladies of the White Gloves". They continued to parade for this event each year up until 1979. The Motor Maids are required to wear royal blue mock turtleneck and white cotton vest, jet-black slacks, and clean black footwear. For parades white gloves are added. The rest are required at a convention for the parade, formal group picture, and banquet.

References

Motorcycle clubs in the United States
Women's organizations based in the United States
Women motorcyclists
Organizations established in 1938
Dud Perkins Award winners
Motorcycle clubs in Canada